Matthew Halliday (born 14 July 1979) is a motor racing driver. He was born in Auckland, New Zealand.

Single seater racing
Halliday's formula racing career has involved various single seater series in New Zealand, Australia, Europe and the United States. Following two seasons in the Formula Holden category contesting the Australian Drivers' Championship in 1999 and 2000, he moved to the United States and ran in both the Indy Lights and Toyota Atlantic series in 2001.  In 2002 he moved to the Infiniti Pro Series but was injured after two races. He finished 3rd and 4th in the inaugural A1 Grand Prix races at Brands Hatch in 2005 went on to have a very successful season with A1 Team New Zealand. He ran the first three races of the 2007 Champ Car World Series season for Conquest Racing however his sponsorship ended after three races and he was replaced by Jan Heylen. He was to drive for Team Australia in the 2008 Champ Car season but this didn't happen with the merger in to the IndyCar Series.

GT and touring car racing
Halliday has been a regular in Carrera Cup racing in his native New Zealand with the odd season in the Australian Carrera Cup Championship and also the Porsche Supercup. Along with this he has races in the Australian V8 Supercars as an endurance driver from 2004 to 2013.

Career results

Career summary

American open–wheel racing results
(key)

Indy Lights

Champ Car

Complete A1 Grand Prix results
(key) (Races in bold indicate pole position) (Races in italics indicate fastest lap)

Touring / sports cars

Complete V8 Supercar results

Complete Porsche Supercup results
(key) (Races in bold indicate pole position) (Races in italics indicate fastest lap)

† Guest driver (no points awarded)

Complete GT1 World Championship results

Complete Bathurst 1000 results

External links
 http://www.matthalliday.com/
Career statistics from driverdb.com

1979 births
Living people
New Zealand racing drivers
A1 Team New Zealand drivers
Formula Renault V6 Eurocup drivers
Formula V6 Asia drivers
Champ Car drivers
Indy Lights drivers
Atlantic Championship drivers
Toyota Racing Series drivers
Supercars Championship drivers
Formula Holden drivers
FIA GT1 World Championship drivers
Sportspeople from Auckland
Porsche Supercup drivers
Blancpain Endurance Series drivers
V8SuperTourer drivers
24 Hours of Spa drivers
Australian Endurance Championship drivers
A1 Grand Prix drivers
Conquest Racing drivers
W Racing Team drivers
Team Meritus drivers
Audi Sport drivers
Super Nova Racing drivers
Dick Johnson Racing drivers
Michelin Pilot Challenge drivers